The Women's 400 metre individual medley competition of the swimming events at the 2015 World Aquatics Championships was held on 9 August with the heats and the final.

Records
Prior to the competition, the existing world and championship records were as follows.

Results

Heats
The heats were held at 10:00.

Final
The final was held at 18:49.

References

Women's 400 metre individual medley
World Aquatics Championships
2015 in women's swimming